Joop van der Heide (21 July 1917 – 29 July 1980) was a Dutch footballer. Born in Rotterdam, Van der Heide played his whole career at Feijenoord and won one cap for the Netherlands.

Honours
 1935-36 : Eredivisie winner with Feijenoord
 1937-38 : Eredivisie winner with Feijenoord
 1939-40 : Eredivisie winner with Feijenoord

1917 births
1980 deaths
Footballers from Rotterdam
Dutch footballers
Feyenoord players
Netherlands international footballers
Association football defenders